Kirova is a rural locality (a settlement) in Svetloyarsky District, Volgograd Oblast, Russia. The population was 2,616 as of 2010. There are 45 streets.

Geography 
Kirova is located 28 km west of Svetly Yar (the district's administrative centre) by road. Chapurniki is the nearest rural locality.

References 

Rural localities in Svetloyarsky District